= Ka Tat Tsang =

Chinese-Canadian professor (born 1954)

Adolf Ka Tat Tsang (Chinese: 曾家達; born 1954) is a Chinese-Canadian professor who holds the Factor-Inwentash Chair in Social Work at the University of Toronto. The key themes of his work are developing human services, post-professional outlook, diversity, global community, and the blending of both theory and research. He developed the SSLD System.

== Biography ==
Tsang was born in Hong Kong in 1954. He earned his Bachelor of Social Sciences degree in Social Work and Psychology, and a master's degree in Clinical Psychology from the University of Hong Kong. Tsang worked as a clinical psychologist and taught at the University of Hong Kong during the 1980s.

Tsang started teaching social work courses in China in 1986, and supported the development of numerous social work programs and initiatives. He moved to Canada in 1989, where he completed his doctoral studies and started teaching at the University of Toronto. He has remained engaged with direct practice in different areas of human service in different parts of the world. He held the Factor-Inwentash Chair in Social Work and the Global Community from 2008 to 2018. He has worked on promoting social work and human service in many countries, including Canada, China, India, Japan, New Zealand, South Korea, Taiwan, Tanzania, and Turkey.

== SSLD ==
Tsang developed the SSLD System, a needs-oriented approach to understanding human behavior. Since the system's establishment in 2005, SSLD has been applied to a wide range of human service contexts internationally.

Tsang is the author of Learning to Change Lives: The Strategies and Skills Learning and Development Approach, published in 2013 by University of Toronto Press.
